Zin Kyaik is a town located in Paung Township, Thaton District, Mon State of Myanmar. The Rock Ship Waterfall Resort in Zin Kyaik is frequently visited by tourists and foreigners.

Photos

References

Township capitals of Myanmar
Populated places in Mon State
Old Cities of Mon people